Bent is a 2018 American crime thriller film directed and written by Robert Moresco, based on a 2009 book Deadly Codes by JP O'Donnell. It starred Karl Urban, Sofía Vergara, and Andy García.

Plot
Bent follows Danny Gallagher (Karl Urban), a discredited narcotics detective who, upon his release from prison, makes plans to seek revenge on the accuser who framed him and killed his partner. Through his quest, Gallagher is forced to confront a ruthless, seductive government agent Rebecca (Sofía Vergara), who may or may not be on his side; and his mentor Jimmy Murtha (Andy García), a retired cop who has fought corruption his entire career.

Cast
 Karl Urban as Danny Gallagher
 Sofía Vergara as Rebecca
 Andy García as Jimmy Murtha
 Grace Byers as Kate
 Vincent Spano as Charlie Horvath
 Tonya Cornelisse as Helen
 John Finn as Driscoll

Reception
Bent has grossed $55,429 in worldwide theatrical box office, and sales of its DVD/Blu-ray releases have cashed $144,589.

References

External links

2018 films
2018 crime thriller films
American crime thriller films
Films scored by Zacarías M. de la Riva
2010s English-language films
Films directed by Robert Moresco
2010s American films